Ips borealis is a species of typical bark beetle in the family Curculionidae. It is found in North America.

Subspecies
These two subspecies belong to the species Ips borealis:
 Ips borealis borealis
 Ips borealis lanieri Wood

References

Further reading

 
 

Scolytinae
Articles created by Qbugbot
Beetles described in 1911